Nayanjot Lahiri is a historian and archaeologist of ancient India and a professor of history at Ashoka University. She was previously on the faculty of the department of history at the University of Delhi.

She is the winner of the 2013 Infosys Prize, in the humanities, for her work in archaeology and the 2016 awardee of the John F. Richards prize for her book Ashoka in Ancient India. She also served on the Humanities jury for the Infosys Prize from 2017 to 2018.

Works
Her books include The Archaeology of Indian Trade Routes (1992) and Finding Forgotten Cities (2005). She has edited The Decline and Fall of the Indus Civilization (2000) and an issue of World Archaeology entitled The Archaeology of Hinduism (2004).

Bibliography

References

20th-century Indian archaeologists
Year of birth missing (living people)
Living people
Indian women historians
Indian women archaeologists
20th-century Indian women scientists
21st-century Indian women scientists
21st-century Indian archaeologists
Historians of India
People associated with the Indus Valley civilisation
Indian social sciences writers
Indian popular science writers
21st-century Indian women writers
20th-century Indian women writers
21st-century Indian historians